The Instituto Nacional de Estadística (INE) is the official agency in Spain that collects statistics about demography, economy, and Spanish society. It is an autonomous organization responsible for overall coordination of statistical services of the General State Administration in monitoring, control and supervision of technical procedures. Every 10 years, this organization conducts a national census. The last census took place in 2011.

Through the official website one can follow all the updates of different fields of study.

History

First agency and evolution
The oldest statistics agency of Spain and the predecessor of the current agency was the General Statistics Commission of the Kingdom, created on November 3, 1856 during the reign of Isabella II. The so-then Prime Minister Narváez approved a decree creating this body and ordering that people with recognized ability in this matter were part of it.

On May 1, 1861, the Commission changed its name to General Statistics Board and their first work was to do a population census.

By a decree of September 12, 1870, Prime Minister Serrano created the Geographic Institute and in 1873 this Institute changed its name to Geographic and Statistic Institute assuming the competences of the General Statistics Board. In 1890, the titularity of the agency was transferred from the Prime Minister's Office to the Ministry of Development.

Between 1921 and 1939, change its name many times. In the same way, the agency was transferred from one ministry to another, passing through the Deputy Prime Minister's Office, the Ministry of the Presidency, and the Ministry of Labour.

National Statistics Institute
The National Statistics Institute was created following the Law of December 31, 1945, published in the Boletín Oficial del Estado (BOE) of January 3, 1946, with a mission to develop and refine the demographic, economic and social statistics already existing, creating new statistics and coordination with the statistical offices of provincial and municipal areas.

At the end of 1964 the first computer was installed at the INE. It was a first-generation IBM 1401, for which a team was formed consisting of four statistics faculty and ten technicians. In the four years following it was possible that said computer would operate at its full capacity.

From 29 October 2019 until eights days later, INE will ascertain mobile phone movements to know the usual shifts to improve his services.

Headquarters 

The main headquarters of the INE is located at Paseo de la Castellana no. 183, in Madrid. Although the building was built in 1973, it was thoroughly restored between 2006 and 2008, through a work by the architects César Ruiz-Larrea and Antonio Gómez Gutiérrez, who have completely transformed its original appearance (ocher in color) giving it a colorful appearance, since colored panels with numbers ranging from 001 to 058 have been placed on the façade. This façade is the work of the sculptor José María Cruz Novillo and has been called the Decaphonic Diaphragm of Digits.

It also has delegations and an Electoral Census Office in all provincial capitals.

Publications

Statistical Yearbook 
Spain Statistical Yearbook (in Spanish, Anuario Estadístico de España) is published annually since 1943 (first edition was in 1858, but at first publication was not regular). It provides information on multiple aspects of Spanish reality, using latest information available at the time of publication: territory and environment, demography, education, health, economy, agriculture, living conditions, culture and leisure, industry and energy, etc. In addition, an international comparison is also included for some of these aspects. All editions since 1858 are accessible online, its content being reusable, both commercially and non-commercially, under certain conditions, specified on its website.

References

External links 
INE Website 
Spain Statistical Yearbook (Anuario Estadístico de España) (in Spanish) 

Demographics of Spain
Scientific organisations based in Spain
Spain
Government agencies of Spain